"Black Gold" is a 1993 single performed by Minneapolis rock band Soul Asylum. The song was written by Soul Asylum's lead singer Dave Pirner. It was the second single from their album Grave Dancers Union.

The music video for the song was directed by American filmmaker Zack Snyder, who also directed the "Somebody to Shove" videoclip.

Track listing
 "Black Gold" - 3:57
 "Black Gold" (Live) - 3:57
 "The Break"

Charts

References

1992 songs
1993 singles
Soul Asylum songs
Songs written by Dave Pirner
Song recordings produced by Michael Beinhorn
Columbia Records singles